"I Don't Like to Sleep Alone" is a song written by Paul Anka and performed by Anka featuring Odia Coates. It was featured on his 1975 album Feelings. The song was arranged by Jimmie Haskell and produced by Rick Hall.

Chart performance
In his native Canada, the song  reached #1 on both the Canadian pop chart and Adult Contemporary chart 
In the US, the song went to #8 on both the U.S. pop and Easy Listening charts in 1975.

Certifications

Other facts
The song was nominated for the Juno Award for Single of the Year in 1976, but lost to "You Ain't Seen Nothing Yet" by Bachman–Turner Overdrive.
The song ranked #72 on Billboard magazine's Top 100 singles of 1975.

References

1975 songs
1975 singles
Songs written by Paul Anka
Paul Anka songs
RPM Top Singles number-one singles
United Artists Records singles